Victor Billot is a former co-leader and electoral candidate for New Zealand's Alliance party. He is also known as a writer, musician, unionist, past editor of Critic magazine, and a performer in the bands Alpha Plan, Age of Dog and Das Phaedrus.

NewLabour and the Alliance Party
Billot was a founding member of the NewLabour Party, which was set up in 1989 by Jim Anderton. In 1991, NewLabour was one of four parties to form the Alliance political party.

In 2008, he was berated by the Prime Minister, Helen Clark, for all the faults of the National Party when she mistook him for a supporter of that party.

At the party's 2006 conference, held in Wellington, no co-leaders were elected. Instead the party decided to concentrate on internal reorganisation; Billot was elected president. At the 2007 national conference, held in Dunedin, two co-leaders were elected, Billot and Kay Murray, with Paul Piesse returning to his former role as Party President. Billot was co-leader for one year.

Billot persuaded his Wellington friend and businessman Jack Yan to stand for the Alliance in 2008; Yan was number 12 on the list, but did not contest an electorate.

He stepped down from his role as Spokesman and occasional co-leader of the Alliance Party in March 2014.

Billot still engages in left wing activism in Dunedin, campaigning against cuts to postal services in 2015.

Professional life
Billot was the National Communications Officer for the Maritime Union of New Zealand between 2003 and 2016. In January 2017 he began working as publicist for the Otago University Press. He writes a weekly column for Newsroom.

Publications 
Billot has published three poetry collections:

 2014: Mad Skillz For The Demon Operators
 2015: Machine Language
 2017: Ambient Terror

His work has also appeared in Australian and New Zealand literary journals including Cordite, Meniscus, Minarets and Takahē.

Recordings 
Billot has recorded several albums since the early 1990s with music groups in addition to a solo album, including:

 1996: City of Bastards by Alpha Plan
 2002: Plutocracy by Victor Billot
 2016: Machine Language by Alpha Plan

References

External links

 Billot's official site
 Indonesian crew members suffered 'months of abuse' interview given to TVNZ News at 8 in 2011 (5:39)

New Zealand writers
New Zealand musicians
Alliance (New Zealand political party) politicians
NewLabour Party (New Zealand) politicians
Living people
University of Otago alumni
Unsuccessful candidates in the 2005 New Zealand general election
Unsuccessful candidates in the 2008 New Zealand general election
Unsuccessful candidates in the 2011 New Zealand general election
Year of birth missing (living people)